NBR Class M may refer to:

 NBR Class M 4-4-0, a class of steam locomotive of the North British Railway
 NBR Class M 4-4-2T, a locomotive designed by William P. Reid